The dark-backed imperial pigeon (Ducula lacernulata) is a species of bird in the family Columbidae. It is endemic to the Lesser Sunda Islands.

Its natural habitats are subtropical or tropical moist lowland forests and subtropical or tropical moist montane forests.

References

dark-backed imperial pigeon
Birds of the Lesser Sunda Islands
dark-backed imperial pigeon
Taxonomy articles created by Polbot